Pape Habib Guèye (born 20 September 1999) is a Senegalese professional footballer who plays as a forward for KV Kortrijk.

Career

Club career
Playing his youth career with Académie Darou Salam, he was a squad member for the 2017 Africa U-20 Cup of Nations, where Senegal finished as runners-up.

He joined Norwegian second-tier side Aalesund ahead of the 2018 season. He scored 22 goals for Aalesund in two seasons, but also had disciplinary issues.

In January 2020, during the winter transfer window, he was bought by K.V. Kortrijk of the top-tier Belgian First Division A.

References

External links

1999 births
Living people
Senegalese footballers
Senegalese expatriate footballers
Senegal youth international footballers
Association football forwards
Aalesunds FK players
K.V. Kortrijk players
Norwegian First Division players
Belgian Pro League players
Expatriate footballers in Norway
Senegalese expatriate sportspeople in Norway
Expatriate footballers in Belgium
Senegalese expatriate sportspeople in Belgium